Timur Irekovich Boguslavskiy (born 30 April 2000) is a professional racing driver from Russia, currently competing in GT World Challenge Europe with AKKA ASP. Driving a Mercedes-AMG GT3, Boguslavskiy won the overall series championship in 2020.

Racing career
Boguslavskiy began his career in 2015 in the Winter Rotax Max Kazan. He also raced in Russian Automobile Federation Rallycross Cup, Russian Rallycross Championship, Canyon Cup and Winter Canyon Cup (circuit racing series in Tatarstan), Tatarstan Circuit Racing Championship and Tatarstan Circuit Racing Cup, Russian Circuit Racing Series, Seat Ibiza Cup Italia, Radical Middle East Cup, Renault Clio Cup Italia, European Le Mans Series, Lamborghini Super Trofeo Europe.

Racing record

Career summary

Complete European Le Mans Series results

*

Complete Lamborghini Super Trofeo Europe results

Complete Russian Circuit Racing Series results
(key) (Races in bold indicate pole position) (Races in italics indicate fastest lap)

Complete GT World Challenge Europe Sprint Cup results
(key) (Races in bold indicate pole position) (Races in italics indicate fastest lap)

References

External links

2000 births
Living people
Russian racing drivers
European Le Mans Series drivers
Russian Circuit Racing Series drivers
Sportspeople from Kazan
24H Series drivers
Target Racing drivers
Mercedes-AMG Motorsport drivers
Le Mans Cup drivers